Bahattin Topal (born 29 March 1942) is a Turkish alpine skier. He competed at the 1964 Winter Olympics and the 1968 Winter Olympics.

References

1942 births
Living people
Turkish male alpine skiers
Olympic alpine skiers of Turkey
Alpine skiers at the 1964 Winter Olympics
Alpine skiers at the 1968 Winter Olympics
Sportspeople from Erzurum
20th-century Turkish people